The 2015 Viterra Saskatchewan Scotties Tournament of Hearts, the provincial women's curling championship of Saskatchewan were held January 21 to 25 at the Assiniboia Curling Club in Assiniboia, Saskatchewan.  The winning team was the Stefanie Lawton rink from Saskatoon, who defeated the Michelle Englot rink in the final for the second straight year. Her team will represent Saskatchewan at the 2015 Scotties Tournament of Hearts in Moose Jaw.

Teams
The teams are listed as follows:

Round-robin standings
Final round-robin standings

Scores

January 21
Draw 1
Goertzen 7-4 Fleming
Selzer 11-4 Thienes

Draw 2
Englot 7-4 Vey
Paulsen 9-2 Barber
Lawton 5-4 Hanson
Eberle 7-1 Barker

January 22
Draw 3
Paulsen 12-4 Thienes
Hanson 6-4 Selzer
Fleming 5-4 Eberle
Vey 11-4 Goertzen

Draw 4
Barker 7-6 Goertzen
Lawton 8-4 Thienes
Barber 5-4 Selzer
Englot 6-4 Fleming

January 23
Draw 5
Lawton 6-3 Selzer
Barker 9-5 Fleming
Goertzen 8-4 Englot
Barber 7-4 Thienes

Draw 6
Englot 8-1 Barker
Vey 7-6 Eberle 
Lawton 6-3 Barber
Hanson 7-6 Paulsen

Draw 7
Eberle 8-6 Goertzen 6
Hanson 7-2 Thienes
Paulsen 12-4 Selzer
Vey 7-4 Fleming

January 24
Draw 8
Hanson 8-4 Barber
Englot 7-6 Eberle
Vey 8-5 Barker
Lawton 6-5 Paulsen

Playoffs

Final

References

2015 Scotties Tournament of Hearts
Curling in Saskatchewan